"Gasoline" is a song by South African rock band Seether. It is the first track on their album Disclaimer which included the 5 Songs EP.

Music video
The music video for the song features the band performing in a darkened space and a girl in her bedroom surrounded by fashion magazines and cosmetics. As the video progresses, the girl is shown using the cosmetics in an attempt to cover words that are scrawled on her face such as "liar" and "hypocrite". As the song reaches the bridge and final chorus, it is revealed that the band had been performing behind the mirror as singer Shaun Morgan busts through it, knocking over a candle and setting fire to her magazines.

Morgan later recalled on the Disclaimer II DVD that the video didn't turn out the way he had intended and that certain shots, such as Morgan appearing as an apparition on the girl's bed as she attempted to cover her face, were interpreted incorrectly by the video's director.

Track listing

"Driven Under" (acoustic version)
"Broken" (acoustic version)
"Gasoline" (demo version)
"Gasoline" (radio version)*
"Tied My Hands" (acoustic version)
(*)Denotes the only song in full studio quality. The others are in "Demo" quality.

Chart positions

Seether songs
2003 singles
2002 songs
Wind-up Records singles
Songs written by Dale Stewart
Songs written by Shaun Morgan